Michael "Mickey" Meaney (born 5 December 1989) is a former Irish professional darts player who competes in British Darts Organisation events. He has qualified for the 2014 BDO World Darts Championship.

Career

BDO
He qualified for the 2014 BDO World Darts Championship, he played Harley Kemp of Australia in the preliminary round winning 3–0. He played Ross Montgomery in the first round losing 2–3.

Meaney Quit the BDO in 2020.

World Championship results

BDO
 2014: First round (lost to Ross Montgomery 2–3) (sets)

References

External links
 Michael Meaney on Darts Database

Living people
Irish darts players
British Darts Organisation players
1989 births